Glenea jordani is a species of beetle in the family Cerambycidae. It was described by Lepesme and Stephan von Breuning in 1952.

Subspecies
 Glenea jordani jordani Lepesme & Breuning, 1952
 Glenea jordani zairensis Breuning, 1981

Varietas
 Glenea jordani var. gabunensis Breuning
 Glenea jordani var. interruptevittata Breuning
 Glenea jordani var. orientalis Aurivillius
 Glenea jordani var. trivitticeps Lepesme & Breuning
 Glenea jordani var. vagemaculata Breuning

References

jordani
Beetles described in 1952